GeoFS is a multi-platform browser-based flight simulator based on the Cesium WebGL Virtual Globe. The free map is based on images taken by the Sentinel-2 satellite while the HD map is from Bing Maps. The game features a variety of planes including aircraft contributed from the community. The game also features multiplayer environment for pilots to interact with each other. In Q4 2018, the GeoFS app was released for both Android and iOS devices. GeoFS on mobile features the Original, as well as a Lite app. The main difference between the two is that the Lite version is Single-Player, contains three total aircraft, and only features the island of Corsica, while the paid one also features multiplayer, a much wider variety of aircraft, and worldwide Sentinel-2 satellite imagery, with HD Bing Maps imagery being an in-app purchase, as opposed to a subscription in the Web version of GeoFS.

History 
Created by Xavier Tassin, GeoFS was launched in October 2010. It was originally built on the Google Earth plug-in as GEFS-Online (Google Earth Flight Simulator). On September 1, 2015, support for the Google Earth plugin ended, which nearly resulted in a complete shutdown of GeoFS. In January 2016, in light of the Google Earth plugin's termination, GeoFS migrated to CesiumJS, an open source virtual globe platform.

List of planes available in GeoFS

Official (created by GeoFS)

"Default" refers to instances where the livery could not be identified.

References

External links 
 
GeoFS Official Twitter

2010 video games
Browser games
General flight simulators
Online games
Flight simulation video games